The 2010 Philadelphia Independence season was the team's inaugural season of competition in the Women's Professional Soccer league.

Review
The Philadelphia Independence of Women's Professional Soccer ended the 2010 season with a record of 10 wins and 10 losses and 4 ties for 34 points finishing third in WPS. The team compiled a postseason mark of 2-1. Paul Riley coached the team. The 2010 Philadelphia Independence lost in the Championship.

Squad

Roster
2010 Independence Roster

Team management

Competition

Women's Professional Soccer

Regular season

Results by round

Home/away results

League table

WPS Playoffs

Statistics

Players without any appearance are not included.

|-
|colspan="14"|Goalkeepers:
|-

|-
|colspan="14"|Defenders:
|-

|-
|colspan="14"|Midfielders:
|-

|-
|colspan="14"|Forwards:
|-

Transfers

2010 WPS Draft
The 2010 WPS Draft was held on January 15, 2010 in Philadelphia, Pennsylvania where the Independence selected five players.

In

Out

Awards

Player of the Week

Player of the Month

WPS year-end awards

Source

2010 WPS Best XI

Source

See also
2010 Women's Professional Soccer season

References

Philadelphia Independence seasons
American soccer clubs 2010 season
2010 Women's Professional Soccer season
2010 in sports in Pennsylvania